Anson Constituency was a constituency in Singapore. It used to exist from 1959 to 1988 and was merged into Tiong Bahru Group Representation Constituency in 1988.

Member of Parliament

Elections

Elections in the 1950s

Elections in the 1960s

Elections in the 1970s

Elections in the 1980s

References

Singaporean electoral divisions
Tanjong Pagar
Constituencies established in 1959
Constituencies disestablished in 1988
1959 establishments in Singapore
1988 disestablishments in Singapore